The Bearded is an epithet of:

 Baldwin IV, Count of Flanders (980–1035)
 Constans II (630–668), ruler of the Byzantine Empire
 Eberhard I, Duke of Württemberg (1445–1496)
 Geoffrey III, Count of Anjou (c. 1040–1096)
 George, Duke of Saxony (1471–1539), known for his opposition to the Protestant Reformation
 Godfrey the Bearded (c. 997–1069), Duke of Upper and Lower Lorraine
 Gwynllyw (c. 450–500), Welsh king and saint, known in English in a corrupted form as Woolos the Bearded
 Henry the Bearded (c. 1165/70–1238), Duke of Silesia at Wrocław, Duke of Kraków and High Duke of all Poland
 Louis VII, Duke of Bavaria (c. 1368–1447)

See also
 Constantine IV (c. 652–685), Byzantine emperor sometimes incorrectly called "the Bearded" out of confusion with his father, Constans II

Lists of people by epithet